Joakym Illja Morokhovskyj - (1576 in Lviv – 19 March 1631 in Volodymyr) was a Greek-Catholic Bishop of Volodymyr–Brest from 1613 to 1631.

Life 
He studied at the Pontifical Greek College of Saint Athanasius in Rome and then served as secretary to the Polish king Sigismund III Vasa. In 1612 he joined the Basilian monastic order, and in 1614 he was consecrated bishop of Volodymyr. He worked with Metropolitans  Ipatij Potij and Josyf Rutskyj to extend the Uniate church. 

Morokhovskyj wrote a number of works of polemical literature directed against Orthodoxy, including Paryhoria (1612, a response to Meletius Smotrytsky) and Dyskurs o początku rozerwania cerkwi greckiej od kościoła rzymskiego (A Discussion on the Origins of the Separation of the Greek Church from the Roman Church, 1622). He also wrote biographies of Josaphat Kuntsevych and Potij..

Notes

External links
 Morokhovsky, Yoakym at Encyclopedia of Ukraine

1576 births
1631 deaths
Clergy from Lviv
People from Ruthenian Voivodeship
17th-century Eastern Catholic bishops
Bishops of the Uniate Church of the Polish–Lithuanian Commonwealth
Bishops in Ukraine
Order of Saint Basil the Great
Ukrainian writers